The 224th Battalion, CEF was a unit in the Canadian Expeditionary Force during the First World War.

History
Based in Ottawa, Ontario, the unit began recruiting in early 1916 in that city and surrounding district. The battalion was created to recruit men with forestry skills. They were going to serve France and Britain. A six-week recruitment took place and over 1,600 men joined the battalion. They did tasks such as site clearing, building railroad components, and collecting lumber for building purposes. After sailing to England in May 1916, the battalion became the 224th Forestry Battalion.  The 224th Battalion, CEF had one Officer Commanding: Lieut-Col. A McDougall.

References

Footnotes

Sources
Meek, John F. Over the Top! The Canadian Infantry in the First World War. Orangeville, Ont.: The Author, 1971.

Battalions of the Canadian Expeditionary Force
Military units and formations of Ontario